Richard Stephen Hawkins (born 2 April 1939) is a bishop in the Church of England and currently a chapter canon of Exeter Cathedral.

Hawkins was educated at Exeter College, Oxford, and trained for ordination at St Stephen's House, Oxford. In his early ministry he was a team vicar in rural Devon and the city of Exeter. He was then Archdeacon of Totnes before being ordained to the episcopate as the suffragan Bishop of Plymouth in the Diocese of Exeter. He was later translated to Crediton in the same diocese.

Hawkins' father, John Hawkins, was the Archdeacon of Totnes.

References

 

1939 births
Alumni of Exeter College, Oxford
Bishops of Crediton
Anglican bishops of Plymouth
Archdeacons of Totnes
Living people
20th-century Church of England bishops